St. Vincent Ferrer Catholic Church may refer to:

 St. Vincent Ferrer Catholic Church (Delray Beach, Florida)
 Church of St. Vincent Ferrer (New York)
 St. Vincent Ferrer Catholic Church, Menifee

See also 
 St. Vincent's Church (disambiguation)